Gail Bates (born December 24, 1945) was a member of the Maryland Senate from 2015 to 2019 and a member of the Maryland House of Delegates from 2002 to 2015. She was selected to replace Robert Kittleman in the Maryland House of Delegates in February 2002 when Kittleman was selected to replace Chris McCabe in the Maryland State Senate. In a close election in 2018, Bates was defeated by non-profit executive Katie Fry Hester by 1.7 percentage points. Bates was nominated to serve on the state Board of Education by Gov. Larry Hogan in February 2019.

Education
Bates graduated from the University of Maryland in 1968 with a B.S. in Education.  She later took courses at UMBC.

Career
Bates was a mathematics and home economics teacher in Anne Arundel County from 1968 to 1973. She then served as an office manager for H&R Block from 1976 to 1980. In 1980, she held a position as a tax supervisor for Mark Buckley, C.P.A.  From 1983 to 1984 she was a manager for the Records and Tax Department of the Maryland Farm Bureau. Since 1984, she has been a sole proprietor as a Certified Public Accountant.  She served as an assistant to the Howard County Executive from 1991 to 1998 and was Chief of Staff for Delegate Donald E. Murphy in District 12A from 1999 until 2002.

Bates has been an active member of different organizations such as the Howard County Republican Club, the Maryland Federation of Republican Women, the Howard County Republican Central Committee (serving as Treasurer from 1980 until 1984), the Howard County Chamber of Commerce, the Maryland Association of Certified Public Accountants, and Howard County Republican Women, serving as president since 2001.

As a member of the Maryland General Assembly, Bates served on the Appropriations Committee, the Joint Committee on Children, Youth, and Families, and the Special Joint Committee on Pensions.

She was a board member of the Howard County Chapter of the American Red Cross from 1996 until 1999.  She has served with the Christian Jail Ministry since 1997 and the Howard County Farm Bureau since 1998. She has been the Treasurer of the Howard County Tourism Council since 2004.  She is a member of the Therapeutic Horsemanship Association and received the Life Achievement Award from the Howard County Republican Central Committee in 1990.

In 2007, Bates sponsored a bill that would have defined marriage as between one man and one woman in the state of Maryland, barring same-sex marriage in the state. The bill was voted down in the Judiciary Committee.

Legislative notes
voted against the Clean Indoor Air Act of 2007 (HB359)
voted against the Healthy Air Act in 2006 (SB154)

Election results
In the 2002 election, Bates defeated Democrats Walter E. Carson and Tony McGuffin to maintain the seat she'd been appointed to. In 2006, District 9A would be represented by two delegates.  She won again along with fellow Republican Warren E. Miller, when they defeated Democrat David Leonard Osmundson.

2018 Race for Maryland State Senate - District 9
Voters to choose one:
{|class="wikitable"
|-
!Name
!Votes
!Percent
!Outcome
|-
|-
|Katie Fry Hester, Dem.
|33,493
|  50.8%
|   Won
|-
|-
|Gail H. Bates, Rep.
|32,347
|  49.1
|   Lost
|-
|}

2010 Race for Maryland House of Delegates – District 9A
Voters to choose two:
{| class="wikitable"
|-
!Name
!Votes
!Percent
!Outcome
|-
|-
|Gail H. Bates, Rep.
|21,709
|  30.6%
|   Won
|-
|-
|Warren E. Miller, Rep.
|19,911
|  28.0%
|   Won
|-
|-
|Maryann Maher, Dem.
|15,264
|  21.5%
|   Lost
|-
|Jonathan Weinstein, Dem.
|14,110
|  19.9%
|   Lost
|-
|Other Write-Ins
|      40
|    0.1%
|   Lost
|}

2006 Race for Maryland House of Delegates – District 9A
Voters to choose two:
{|class="wikitable"
|-
!Name
!Votes
!Percent
!Outcome
|-
|-
|Gail H. Bates, Rep.
|22,862
|  39.6%
|   Won
|-
|-
|Warren E. Miller, Rep.
|18,533
|  32.1%
|   Won
|-
|-
|David Leonard Osmundson, Dem.
|16,162
|  28.0%
|   Lost
|-
|Other Write-Ins
|123
|  0.2%
|   Lost
|-
|}

2002 Race for Maryland House of Delegates – District 9A
Voters to choose two:
{|class="wikitable"
|-
!Name
!Votes
!Percent
!Outcome
|-
|-
|Gail H. Bates, Rep.
|20,783
|  33.0%
|   Won
|-
|-
|Robert L. Flanagan, Rep.
|21,263
|  33.8%
|   Won
|-
|-
|Walter E. Carson
|10,424
|  16.6%
|   Lost
|-
|-
|Tony McGuffin
|10,423
|  16.6%
|   Lost
|-
|Other Write-Ins
|33
|  0.1%
|   Lost
|-
|}

References and notes

External links

Republican Party Maryland state senators
Republican Party members of the Maryland House of Delegates
1945 births
People from West Friendship, Maryland
People from Washington, D.C.
Living people
Women state legislators in Maryland
University of Maryland, College Park alumni
University of Maryland, Baltimore County alumni
21st-century American politicians
21st-century American women politicians